The Umbrian regional election of 2015 took place on 31 May 2015.

Catiuscia Marini of the Democratic Party (PD) was narrowly re-elected President over the joint-centre-right candidate, Claudio Ricci. The PD was by far the largest party, while the Five Star Movement and the Northern League Umbria had a breakthrough.Results

See also

2015 Italian regional elections

References

Elections in Umbria
2015 elections in Italy
May 2015 events in Italy